Ernest Molles (born in Switzerland) was a Swiss international football player.

Career 
Molles was born in Switzerland and played for FC Montriond, now known as FC Lausanne-Sport, in his home country before moving to France after World War I to play for Stade Rennais UC. He spent seven years at the club. In 1922, he played on the team that reached the final of the Coupe de France. In the final, Rennes were defeated 2–0 by Red Star Olympique. Molles also played for the Swiss national team. His only documented appearance was on 23 December 1917 against Austria, which ended in a 1–0 defeat.

References 

Swiss men's footballers
Switzerland international footballers
Stade Rennais F.C. players
FC Lausanne-Sport players
Year of birth missing
Year of death missing
Association football defenders